The discography of Australian indie pop singer, Amy Shark consists of three studio albums, five extended plays and twenty-one singles. It includes releases by the artist under the names, Amy Cushway and by Little Sleeper.

Studio albums

Extended plays

Singles

As lead artist

As featured artist

Promotional singles

Other charted and certified songs

Songwriting credits

Notes

References

Discographies of Australian artists
Pop music group discographies